Kenneth John Barlow (born 1962) is an American television meteorologist currently with KSTP-TV in Minneapolis.

Barlow has a B.S. in meteorology from Plymouth State University.

From 1991 to 2006, Barlow worked at KARE-TV in Minneapolis. He then moved to Boston to become chief meteorologist at WBZ-TV. After four years with WBZ, Barlow joined KXTV in Sacramento, California in May 2010.

In 2011, Barlow returned to the Twin Cities and joined KSTP.

With the KSTP 5 Eyewitness News Morning team, Barlow won an Upper Midwest Emmy Award in 2016 for his role on the program that aired after the death of Prince.

References

1962 births
Living people
American television meteorologists
Plymouth State University alumni
Emmy Award winners